Belarus participated in the ninth Winter Paralympics in Turin, Italy. 

Belarus entered six athletes in the following sport:

Nordic skiing: 3 male, 3 female

Medalists

See also
2006 Winter Paralympics
Belarus at the 2006 Winter Olympics

External links
Torino 2006 Paralympic Games
International Paralympic Committee

2006
Nations at the 2006 Winter Paralympics
Winter Paralympics